The 92nd Infantry Division was an infantry division of the German Heer during World War II.

Operational history 
The 92nd Infantry Division was raised as part of the 25th deployment wave. It was first assembled on 15 January 1944 in Wehrkreis XVII (Vienna) in the town of Nikolsburg. It, like the other divisions of the 25th wave, initially consisted of two rather than the standard three regiments. The two initial regiments of the 92nd Infantry Division were the Grenadier Regiments 1059 and 1060.

The 92nd Infantry Division was sent to Tuscany to participate in the defense against the Allied Italian campaign that had started in 1943. There, the division operated in loose formation and often in several individual combat groups in the Alban Hills until it was dissolved on 20 June 1944. The remaining resources of the 92nd Infantry Division were then used to replenish the strength of the 362nd Infantry Division.

Notes

References 

Infantry divisions of Germany during World War II
Military units and formations established in 1944
Military units and formations disestablished in 1944